HMS Hawke, launched in 1891, was the seventh British warship to be named Hawke. She was an  protected cruiser. In September 1911 the Hawke collided with the ocean liner RMS Olympic. The damage smashed the Hawkes bow and damaged the stern of the Olympic.

Construction
Hawke was laid down at Chatham Dockyard on 17 June 1889, one of nine Edgar-class cruisers ordered for the Royal Navy under the Naval Defence Act 1889, and launched on 11 March 1891. Sea trials in March 1892 were satisfactory, with her engines reaching the required power, and the ship was completed on 16 May 1893.

She displaced .

Armament consisted of two 9.2 inch guns, on the ships centreline, backed up by ten six-inch  guns, of which four were in casemates on the main deck and the remainder behind open shields. Twelve 6-pounder and four 3-pounder guns provided anti-torpedo-boat defences, while four 18 inch torpedo tubes were fitted.

Service
On commissioning, Hawke joined the Mediterranean Fleet, remaining on that station for most of the rest of the decade.

In early 1897, Hawke deployed to Crete to serve in the International Squadron, a multinational force made up of ships of the Austro-Hungarian Navy, French Navy, Imperial German Navy, Italian Royal Navy (Regia Marina), Imperial Russian Navy, and Royal Navy that intervened in the 1897-1898 Greek uprising on Crete against rule by the Ottoman Empire. The uprising prompted Greece to land a Greek Army expeditionary force of 1,500 men on Crete to support the Cretan insurgency, which in turn precipitated the outbreak of the Greco-Turkish War of 1897, also known as the Thirty Days War, in April 1897. The war ended in a quick and disastrous Greek defeat, and the ceasefire agreement required the Greek Army to withdraw from Crete. Accordingly, the Greek expeditionary force embarked aboard Hawke on 23 May 1897 for transportation to Greece. The uprising on Crete continued, however, and the International Squadron continued to operate off Crete until December 1898. In August 1901 Hawke was paid off at Chatham and placed in the Fleet Reserve.

In February 1902 she received orders to prepare to convey relief crews to the Cape of Good Hope Station, and she was commissioned for this duty by Captain Algernon Horatio Anson on 1 April. She left South Africa ten days later, stopping at Saint Helena, Ascension, Sierra Leone, Las Palmas and Madeira before she arrived at Plymouth on 16 June 1902. Captain Julian Charles Allix Wilkinson was appointed to the ship on 23 July, but Anson remained in command when she took part in the fleet review held at Spithead on 16 August 1902 for the coronation of King Edward VII. Following the review Anson was still in command when she left Chatham to convey relief crews for the vessels HMS Vulcan, HMS Foam, HMS Bruizer, HMS Dragon, and HMS Boxer, all serving in the Mediterranean. She arrived at fleet headquarters at Malta on 27 August. Wilkinson had taken the command when she returned to Chatham the following month with the relieved crews of the Vulcan, Boxer, Bruiser, and Foam. She paid off into the A division of the Fleet Reserve at Chatham on 4 October 1902.

In January 1903, she was again ordered to convey relief crews to ships on the Mediterranean station, this time HMS Pyramus, HMS Speedy, HMS Dryad, and HMS Imogene, all recommissioned for new terms on the station. Captain Herbert Whitmore Savory was in command for the journey, and paid her off in March 1903.

In November 1904, Hawke became Boy's Training Ship as part of the 4th Cruiser Squadron, serving in that role until August 1906, when she joined the torpedo school at Sheerness. In 1907, Hawke joined the Home Fleet.

Collision with the liner Olympic

On 20 September 1911, Hawke, under command of Commander W.F. Blunt, collided in the Solent with the White Star ocean liner . In the course of the collision, Hawke lost her bow. (This was replaced by a straight bow). The subsequent trial pronounced Hawke to be free from any blame. During the trial, a theory was advanced that the large amount of water displaced by Olympic had generated a suction that had drawn Hawke off course, causing the Olympic’s voyage to be delayed. The White Star Line lost on appeal.

Sinking

In February 1913, Hawke joined the training squadron based at Queenstown, Ireland (now known as Cobh), where she served along with most of the rest of the Edgar class. In August 1914, on the outbreak of the First World War, Hawke and the other Edgars from Queenstown, formed the 10th Cruiser Squadron, operating on blockade duties between the Shetland Islands and Norway.

In October 1914, the 10th Cruiser Squadron was deployed further south in the North Sea as part of efforts to stop German warships from attacking a troop convoy from Canada. On 15 October, the squadron was on patrol off Aberdeen, deployed in line abreast at intervals of about 16 km (10 miles). Hawke stopped at 9:30 am to pick up mail from sister ship . After recovering her boat with the mail, Hawke proceeded at  without zig-zagging to regain her station, and was out of sight of the rest of the Squadron when at 10:30 a single torpedo from the German submarine  (which had sunk three British cruisers on 22 September), struck Hawke, which quickly capsized. The destroyer  was dispatched from Scapa Flow to search for Hawke and found a raft carrying one officer and twenty-one men, while a boat with a further forty-nine survivors was rescued by a Norwegian steamer. 524 officers and men died, including the ship's captain, Hugh P. E. T. Williams, with only 70 survivors (one man died of his wounds on 16 October).

Citations

References

External links
 Encyclopedia Titanica: HMS Hawke
 HMS Hawke at Battleships-Cruisers.co.uk

 

 

Edgar-class cruisers
Ships built in Chatham
Victorian-era cruisers of the United Kingdom
World War I cruisers of the United Kingdom
Ships sunk by German submarines in World War I
World War I shipwrecks in the North Sea
1891 ships
Maritime incidents in October 1914
Maritime incidents in 1911